Fineness can refer to:

Fineness, a measure of the purity of precious metals
Fineness modulus, a measurement of the coarseness of an aggregate
Fineness ratio, in aerospace engineering, the length to width ratio of a streamlined body